() is a Japanese sports equipment manufacturing company. Yonex produces equipment and apparel for tennis, badminton, golf, and running.

Its range of products manufactured and commercialised includes equipment for badminton and tennis (rackets, shuttlecocks, balls, bags) and golf (clubs, bags). Yonex also produces athletic shoes and apparel including t-shirts, jackets, skirts, shorts, hoodies, leggings and hats.

History 
The company was founded in 1946 by Minoru Yoneyama as a producer of wooden floats for fishing nets. The company was later forced out of this market because of the invention of plastic floats. This led to a commitment by Yoneyama to never again be left behind by technological advancements.

In 1957, Yoneyama began to make badminton racquets for other brands. By 1961, the first Yoneyama-branded racquet was introduced, and within another two years an export company was created for the worldwide distribution. After the company began to make aluminium badminton racquets in 1969, it found that the same technology could be applied to the tennis racket which the company introduced in 1971. The company began to experiment with graphite shafts for both types of rackets and found that these would also be useful for golf clubs.

In 1982 Yonex came out with the new oversized tennis racquet in the REX-series with the R-7 and R-10 racquets. At that time Martina Navratilova played with the R-7 and was very successful. One year later, the new series Rexking was developed with the R-22. Navratilova subsequently used the white RQ 180 widebody frame until the early 1990s.

Finding a growing market, the Yonex Corporation (a wholly owned subsidiary) was established in Torrance, California, US in July 1983. In 1992 Yonex introduced the widebody badminton racket, the "Isometric 500", a racquet that was much less "tear drop"-shaped than previous ones. The more "square" head gave it a much larger striking surface, which provides a larger "sweet spot" to hit the shuttle. It led other manufacturers to follow suit in "square-head" or isometric designs.

The parent company was listed on the Tokyo Stock Exchange in 1994. Yonex describes itself as the world leader in golf, tennis and badminton equipment. Yonex provides clothing for national badminton associations around the world, such as the Malaysian Badminton Association, Badminton Scotland, Badminton England, Badminton Ireland, and Badminton Wales. Yonex has also been teaming up with OCBC (Orange County Badminton Club) since 2007 to host the annual U.S. Open Grand Prix Badminton Championships.

Yonex has become the dominant corporate player in badminton. Yonex sponsors the All England Open Badminton Championships and is a partner of the Badminton World Federation which organizes the World Championships. Upwards of 80% of competitive players use their racquets, as it is the preferred choice amongst professionals. Yonex is significant in the tennis and golf industries as well and is a major sponsor of professional athletes in all three sports.

Sponsorships 
Yonex supplies official materials for the following leagues, athletes, teams, or associations:

Olympic Committees 
  Malaysia
  Singapore
  Korea
  Indonesia
  Thailand

Football

Club teams 
  Avispa Fukuoka
  Kashiwa Reysol
  Tegevajaro Miyazaki
  Tokyo Musashino United  (Since the 2019-2020 season).

Tennis

Male players (active) 

  Pedro Cachín
  Sebastián Báez
  Nick Kyrgios
  Thanasi Kokkinakis
  Jurij Rodionov
  Denis Shapovalov
  Alejandro Tabilo
  Jaume Munar
  Henri Kontinen
  Pierre-Hugues Herbert
  Daniel Altmaier
  Márton Fucsovics
  Yoshihito Nishioka
  Alexander Bublik
  Chung Hyeon
  Ričardas Berankis
  Radu Albot
  Casper Ruud
  Hubert Hurkacz
  Kamil Majchrzak
  Lloyd Harris
  Stan Wawrinka
  Ben Shelton
  Denis Kudla
  Frances Tiafoe
  Marcos Giron
  Steve Johnson
  Tommy Paul

Female players (active) 

  Daria Saville
  Storm Hunter
  Eugenie Bouchard
  Wang Yafan
  Wang Xiyu
  Zhu Lin
  Donna Vekić
  Linda Nosková
  Marie Bouzková
  Markéta Vondroušová
  Clara Tauson
  Aliona Bolsova
  Caroline Garcia
  Fiona Ferro
  Angelique Kerber
  Laura Siegemund
  Sabine Lisicki
  Tamara Korpatsch
  Tatjana Maria
  Harriet Dart
  Katie Swan
  Anna Bondár
  Tímea Babos
  Ankita Raina
  Camila Giorgi
  Jasmine Paolini
  Ena Shibahara
  Nao Hibino
  Naomi Osaka
  Elena Rybakina
  Anastasija Sevastova 
  Magda Linette
  Ana Bogdan
  Elena-Gabriela Ruse
  Irina Bara
  Sorana Cîrstea
  Kamilla Rakhimova
  Varvara Gracheva
  Vitalia Diatchenko
  Olga Danilović
  Viktória Kužmová
  Kaja Juvan
  Tamara Zidanšek
  Mirjam Björklund
  Belinda Bencic
  Stefanie Vögele
  Viktorija Golubic
  Hsieh Su-wei
  Anhelina Kalinina
  Dayana Yastremska
  Alycia Parks
  Asia Muhammad
  CoCo Vandeweghe
  Jessica Pegula
  Taylor Townsend

Former players

  Magdalena Maleeva
  David Nalbandian
  Lleyton Hewitt
  Natasha Zvereva
  Marcelo Ríos
  Zheng Jie
  Iva Majoli
  Nicole Vaidišová
  Caroline Wozniacki
  Andres Gomez
  Sergi Bruguera
  María José Martínez Sánchez
  Arantxa Sánchez Vicario
  Mary Pierce
  Annika Beck
  Anke Huber
  Richard Krajicek
  Elena Dementieva
  Maria Kirilenko
  Anna Kournikova
  Ana Ivanovic
  Martina Hingis
  Daniela Hantuchová
  Magdaléna Rybáriková
  Paradorn Srichaphan
  Elena Baltacha
  Martina Navratilova
  Monica Seles

Badminton Advisory Staff

Badminton National Team Advisory 

  Malaysia
  China
  Korea
  Japan
  Thailand
  India
  Vietnam
  England
  France
  Chinese Taipei
  Spain

Male players

  Lin Dan
  Chou Tien-chen
  Lee Yang
  Wang Chi-lin
  Viktor Axelsen
  Peter Gade
  Chris Adcock
  Marcus Ellis
  Thom Gicquel
  Mark Lamsfuß
  Lee Cheuk Yiu
  Tang Chun Man
  B. Sai Praneeth
  Satwiksairaj Rankireddy
  Chirag Shetty
  Fajar Alfian
  Muhammad Rian Ardianto
  Marcus Fernaldi Gideon
  Taufik Hidayat
  Kevin Sanjaya Sukamuljo
  Hiroyuki Endo
  Takeshi Kamura
  Kento Momota
  Keigo Sonoda
  Kanta Tsuneyama
  Lee Chong Wei
  Choi Sol-gyu
  Lee Yong-dae
  Seo Seung-jae
  Yoo Yeon-seong
  Dechapol Puavaranukroh
  Kantaphon Wangcharoen

Female players 

  Michelle Li
  Gabby Adcock
  Lauren Smith
  Tse Ying Suet
  Saina Nehwal
  Yuki Fukushima
  Arisa Higashino
  Sayaka Hirota
  Mayu Matsumoto
  Nami Matsuyama
  Wakana Nagahara
  Aya Ohori
  Chiharu Shida
  Sayaka Takahashi
  Akane Yamaguchi
  An Se-young
  Chae Yoo-jung
  Chang Ye-na
  Kim Ga-eun
  Kim So-yeong
  Kim Hye-rin
  Kong Hee-yong
  Lee So-hee
  Shin Seung-chan
  Sung Ji-hyun
  Ratchanok Intanon
  Busanan Ongbamrungphan
  Sapsiree Taerattanachai
  Beiwen Zhang

Controversy 
Yonex signed a contract with Chinese Taipei Badminton Association regarding national team jersey sponsorship in 2014. However, Yonex would often send players clothing and shoes to wear a few days before major tournaments, with the shoes unfit for players, as players had blisters and bruises on from playing.

In May 2016, Yonex was ultra vires to criticize the Taiwan national team players who have violated the dress code. Yonex sent official documents to the Chinese Taipei Badminton Association threatening to sue the national team head coaches if the Association could not provide a reasonable answer.

During the 2016 Summer Olympics, Yonex provided unfit shoes to non-contract badminton player Tai Tzu-ying. This forced Tai to wear other shoes made by her personal sponsor brand, Victor, without any logo. This event caused a controversy due to Chinese Taipei Badminton Association is going to punish Tai based on Yonex's pressing. 

After Tai's incident outbreak, there are other five badminton players caught in the same situation and were punished. For example, Yonex was dissatisfied that badminton player Liao Kuan-Hao used his personal sponsor bat and then Yonex was ultra vires to ask Chinese Taipei Badminton Association to fine Liao and force him be suspended for six months.

In August 2016, the Chinese Taipei Badminton Association held a board meeting to resolve the situation. The meeting resulted in 3 key decisions: no punishment will be enforced on the “player”; to accept the resignation of Chairman Tsai Hung-peng for the controversy; to remove the word “Shoes” and “Racquets” from the contract with Yonex.

References

External links 

 

Sportswear brands
Japanese brands
Manufacturing companies based in Tokyo
Sporting goods manufacturers of Japan
Badminton equipment manufacturers
Golf equipment manufacturers
Tennis equipment manufacturers
Cycle manufacturers of Japan
Manufacturing companies established in 1946
1946 establishments in Japan
Companies listed on the Tokyo Stock Exchange